Volodymyr Andriyovych Vasylenko (birth: January 16, 1937, Kiev, Ukraine) is a Ukrainian diplomat who has twice served as Ambassador Extraordinary and Plenipotentiary of Ukraine.

Education 
Volodymyr Vasylenko graduated from Taras Shevchenko National University of Kyiv in 1959.

Career 
1972–1992 – was a scientific consultant of the Ministry of Foreign Affairs of Ukraine for law issues.

In 1989 – was taking part in development of legal basis for economic independence of Ukraine.

In 1990 – as a consultant of the Verkhovna Rada of Ukraine, prepared the first draft of the Declaration of State Sovereignty of Ukraine.

1992 – Ambassador in Benelux countries and also the Representative of Ukraine to the European Union and NATO

1998–2002 – Ambassador Extraordinary and Plenipotentiary of Ukraine to the Great Britain and Northern Ireland.

1991–2009 – expert, advisor, member of the delegation of Ukraine in the UN General Assembly and was representing Ukraine in Third Committee human rights and Sixth Committee legal issues.

2001–2005 – he was elected UN General Assembly judge in the International Criminal Tribunal for the Former Yugoslavia.

2006–2010 – was the Representative of Ukraine to the United Nations Human Rights Council.

In 2014 – head of the Commission to Investigate Human Rights Violations in Ukraine.

References

External links
 Volodymyr VASYLENKO: “Ukraine’s participation in the UN Human Rights Council confirms our country’s civilizational orientation”
 Former Ambassadors of Ukraine to the United Kingdom
 VOLODYMYR VASYLENKO, LEADING UKRAINIAN SPECIALIST IN INTERNATIONAL LAW, ELECTED JUDGE OF INTERNATIONAL TRIBUNAL FOR FORMER YUGOSLAVIA
 Volodymyr Vasylenko: “Government bodies were first and foremost responsible for a civilized regulation and solution of the conflict”
 Statement from Head of the Public Commission for the Investigation and Prevention of Human Rights Violations in Ukraine Volodymyr Vasylenko on Russian Aggression
 Statement from Head of the Public Commission for the Investigation and Prevention of Human Rights Violations in Ukraine Volodymyr Vasylenko on Crimea
 Extraordinary and Plenipotentiary Ambassador of Ukraine , Member of International Criminal Tribunal for the Former Yugoslavia (2001–2005)

Living people
1937 births
Diplomats from Kyiv
Ambassadors of Ukraine to the United Kingdom
Ambassadors of Ukraine to Ireland
Ambassadors of Ukraine to Belgium
Ambassadors of Ukraine to Luxembourg
People's Movement of Ukraine politicians
International Criminal Tribunal for the former Yugoslavia judges
Ambassadors of Ukraine to the European Union
Heads of mission of Ukraine to NATO
Ukrainian People's Party politicians
Ukrainian judges of United Nations courts and tribunals
Ukrainian officials of the United Nations